Adam Comrie (July 31, 1990 – August 8, 2020) was a Canadian-American professional ice hockey defenceman. Comrie was selected by the Florida Panthers in the 3rd round (80th overall) of the 2008 NHL Entry Draft.

Playing career
As a youth Comrie attended and played junior hockey for Stone Bridge High School in Ashburn, Virginia.

Comrie played major junior hockey in the Ontario Hockey League (OHL) with the Saginaw Spirit and the Guelph Storm.

On April 13, 2010, the Florida Panthers signed Comrie to a three-year entry-level contract. Comrie made his professional debut in the American Hockey League with the Rochester Americans during the 2010–11 season.

On July 10, 2013, Comrie was signed to a one-year two-way contract with Worcester's NHL affiliate, the San Jose Sharks. He never appeared with the San Jose Sharks in the 2013–14 season, posting 19 points in 56 games with the California  team's affiliate the Worcester Sharks.

On October 6, 2014, as an un-signed free agent over the summer, Comrie signed to return to the ECHL with the Reading Royals on a one-year deal. He split the season between the Royals and affiliate club, the Lehigh Valley Phantoms of the AHL, producing 18 points in 40 games from the blueline.

On October 10, 2015, Comrie secured a one-year AHL contract with the Phantoms and was reassigned to Royals to begin the 2015–16 season. He was again shuffled between the ECHL and AHL, posting a respectable 15 points in 32 games with Lehigh Valley.

As a free agent on July 26, 2016, Comrie agreed to a one-year deal with the Syracuse Crunch. Comrie remained with the Crunch for the majority of the 2016–17 season, spending a brief stint in the ECHL with the Kalamazoo Wings. In adding a veteran presence, he matched a career best with 19 points in 55 games with the Crunch. With his help on defense, the Crunch would win their division and reach the Calder Cup Finals, but Comrie did not play in any of their playoff games.

Comrie left Syracuse as a free agent and returned to the Reading Royals for the 2017–18 season. On November 4, 2017, he returned on loan to the Lehigh Valley Phantoms and appeared in two games before he was released back to the ECHL.

After 8 professional seasons in North America, Comrie opted to embark on a European career, agreeing to a one-year deal with Austrian club, EC KAC of the EBEL, on July 16, 2018.

Death
Comrie was killed in a motorcycle collision on August 8, 2020 at the age of 30.  The collision occurred while visiting his mother in the U.S. state of Virginia.

Career statistics

Awards and honours

References

External links

1990 births
2020 deaths
Canadian ice hockey defencemen
Cincinnati Cyclones (ECHL) players
Florida Panthers draft picks
Greenville Road Warriors players
Guelph Storm players
Ice hockey people from Ottawa
EC KAC players
Kalamazoo Wings (ECHL) players
Lehigh Valley Phantoms players
Omaha Lancers players
Reading Royals players
Road incident deaths in Virginia
Motorcycle road incident deaths
Rochester Americans players
Saginaw Spirit players
Syracuse Crunch players
Utica Comets players
Worcester Sharks players
People from Ashburn, Virginia